Penda is a feminine given name of Senegalese origin. In the European Early Middle Ages, it was also a masculine name used in the Anglo-Saxon kingdoms.

People
 Penda of Mercia (died 655), a 7th-century king
 Penda Hair, American civil rights lawyer
 Penda Ly (born 1991), Senegalese beauty pageant titleholder
 Penda Mbow (born 1955), Senegalese politician, historian, and activist
 Penda Sy (born 1984), French-Senegalese basketball player

References

See also
 Pænda (born 1989), Austrian singer

 
Feminine given names